Mayfa'a District is a district of the Shabwah Governorate in Yemen. As of 2003, the district had a population of 41,597 inhabitants.

References

Districts of Shabwah Governorate